The Bajing Pavilion (Bajing Tai, 八境台 Bājìng Tái) in Ganzhou, Jiangxi province, China is a three-level pavilion located on the northeast corner of the Ganzhou city wall. Zhang River and Gong River join at a confluence as Gan River at its base.

Bajing Pavilion was originally built by the municipal governor Kong Zonghan() during Jiayou Era (嘉祐 Jiāyòu) 1056–1063, Song Dynasty. In the following a thousand years, it was burnt down several times. The present pavilion was rebuilt in 1984 and opened in 1987. A 7.6-hectare area around the pavilion was adorned as Bajing Park in 1955.

References

Ganzhou
Buildings and structures in Jiangxi